Secrets of the Heart may refer to:

 Secrets of the Heart (film), a 1997 Spanish film
 "Secrets of the Heart" (song), a 1991 song by Chesney Hawkes